Pečeňady (until 1899 ) is a village and municipality in Piešťany District in the Trnava Region of western Slovakia.

History
In historical records the village was first mentioned in 1113.

Famous people 
 Anton Kolarovič (*1894 – † 1977), SDB,  Roman Catholic priest end religious prisoner (sentenced to 5 years in prison).

References

External links
 
 

Villages and municipalities in Piešťany District